The administrative division or territorial organization of Chile exemplifies characteristics of a unitary state. State administration is functionally and geographically decentralized, as appropriate for each authority in accordance with the law.

For the interior government and administration within the State, the territory of the republic has been divided into 16 regions (regiones), 56 provinces (provincias) and 346 communes (comunas) since the 1970s process of reform, made at the request of the National Commission on Administrative Reform (Comisión Nacional de la Reforma Administrativa or CONARA). State agencies exist to promote the strengthening of its regionalization, equitable development and solidarity between regions, provinces and communes within the nation.

Since 2005, the creation, abolition and designation of regions, provinces and communes, the altering of their boundaries, and the establishment of the regional and provincial capitals are part of constitutional law.

The Ministries of Chile (except the Ministries of the Interior, National Defense, Foreign Affairs and Secretary General of the Presidency) are devolved to regional level, being represented by regional ministries, integrating the so-called "regional cabinet," chaired by the regional intendent.

History

The political and administrative division of Chile has had four major periods: before 1833, from 1833 to 1925, from 1925 to 1976 and from 1976 onwards.

Before 1974, Chile was divided into:
 Provinces (provincias) - First level
 Departments (departamentos) - Second level

In October 2007, two new regions came into force: The I Tarapacá Region was divided laterally to create XV Arica and Parinacota Region to the north, and similarly, the X Los Lagos Region was split to create XIV Los Ríos Region to its north. Also there are plans to create a joint region between the provinces of Linares and Cauquenes by splitting the VII Maule Region.

On March 11, 2010, the creation of the Marga Marga Province gave Chile a new total of 56 provinces.

Current structure 

Chile is administratively divided into:

 16 Regions (regiones) - First level administrative division
 56 Provinces (provincias) - Second level administrative division
 346 Communes (comunas) - Third level administrative division

Regions

The regional government is headed by the intendant (intendente), appointed by the President of the Republic. The intendant is advised by the Regional Ministerial Secretaries (Secretaría Regional Ministerial or SEREMIs).

The administration of the region lies in the regional government, constituted by the intendente and the Regional Council (Consejo Regional).

Provinces

The government and administration of each province lies in the provincial governorate (Gobernación Provincial), headed by a governor (gobernador), appointed by the President of the Republic. It exercises its powers in accordance with the instructions from the regional intendant. It is advised by the Provincial Economic and Social Council (Consejo Económico y Social Provincial or CESPRO).

The only exception is the Santiago Province, which makes no provision for a provincial governorate in its regulations. Instead, the position corresponds to the intendant of the Metropolitan Region of Santiago. In January 2001, the Provincial Delegation of Santiago was created with the position of a Provincial Delegate, who exercises the functions of a provincial governor on behalf of the respective intendant.

Municipalities

The local administration of each commune or group of communities resides in the municipality (municipalidad), consisting of an alcalde and a communal council (Consejo Comunal), elected directly for a period of 4 years renewable.

Municipalities represent the decentralization of central power. They are advised by an Economic and Social Communal Council (Consejo Económico y Social Comunal or CESCO), composed of representatives from the most important of the community's organizations and activities.

There are 346 communes and 345 municipalities, as the municipality of Cabo de Hornos manages the grouping of communities of Cape Horn and Antártica. There are proposals to create a number of new communities to be studied by the Secretariat of Regional and Administrative Development (Subsecretaría de Desarrollo Regional y Administrativo or SUBDERE).

Current list of administrative divisions

Proposed structural changes
SUBDERE continues to examine the proposed creation of the provinces of Villarrica, San Carlos, Admiral Simpson, Aconcagua and others.

References

 
Local government in Chile